An asset is an economic resource, or something of value.

Asset, ASSET or The Asset may also refer to:

Computing
 Asset (computer security), an asset in computer security context
 Digital assets, the graphics, audio, and other artistic data that go into media, particularly interactive media such as video games

Economics
 Asset (economics), a durable good which is not fully depreciated to zero value after the current period of analysis

Entertainment
 "The Asset" (Agents of S.H.I.E.L.D.), third episode of U.S. television series Agents of S.H.I.E.L.D.
 The Asset (film), 1918 American film
 The Assets, an eight-part American drama television miniseries
 The Asset, a play by Robert Kemp

Intelligence
 Asset (intelligence), an outside person who provides intelligence

Military
 Military asset, a weapon or means of production of weapons or other defensive or offensive devices or capabilities

Organisations
 Americans Standing for the Simplification of the Estate Tax, a lobbyist group
 Association of Supervisory Staffs, Executives and Technicians, a former British trade union

Spacecraft
 ASSET (spacecraft), an experimental U.S. reentry vehicle

See also
 ASET (disambiguation)